Edward John Pierce (born October 6, 1968) is a former Major League Baseball pitcher who played for one season. He pitched in two games for the Kansas City Royals during the 1992 Kansas City Royals season.

External links

1968 births
Living people
Major League Baseball pitchers
Baseball players from California
Kansas City Royals players
California Golden Bears baseball players
Orange Coast Pirates baseball players
UC Santa Barbara Gauchos baseball players
Baseball City Royals players
Bowie Baysox players
Eugene Emeralds players
Memphis Chicks players
Omaha Royals players